The Big Four: Live from Sofia, Bulgaria is a live video with performances by Metallica, Slayer, Megadeth, and Anthrax, the "big four" of American thrash metal. The concert took place on June 22, 2010, at the Sonisphere Festival at Vasil Levski National Stadium, Sofia, Bulgaria. It was shown at 450 movie theaters in the United States and over 350 movie theaters across Europe, Canada, and Latin America on June 22, 2010.

Reviews of the DVD were mostly favorable. Websites such as AllMusic and About.com were positive, though Blogcritics gave the DVD a mixed review. The DVD peaked at number one on the United States, United Kingdom, Austrian, and Canadian charts, and also charted on five other charts. It was certified gold in Germany, and provided Slayer with its first platinum certification.

Background and release
On June 16, 2010, at the Sonisphere Festival at Bemowo Airport in Warsaw, Poland, the "big four" of American thrash metal—Metallica, Slayer, Megadeth, and Anthrax—performed together for the first time. The bandmembers (except for Slayer's Jeff Hanneman) were first photographed together on the previous day. Their live concert, on June 22, was for one night only. Directed by Nick Wickham, the event was filmed and transmitted via satellite to over 450 movie theaters in the United States and over 350 movie theaters across Europe, Canada, and Latin America, including London's famed Leicester Square. Tickets were made available for around $20 at TheBigFourLive.com, which also listed the theaters where the concert was being screened. Delayed screenings took place in Australia, South Africa and New Zealand.

The film's contents and artwork were revealed on August 25, 2010. A limited-edition guitar pick was unveiled a day after the artwork was revealed. The European release was initially scheduled for October 11, but Metallica later announced on their official site that the European release would be pushed back to October 15, with an International release on October 18, and a North American release on October 19, 2010. On September 15, it was announced that a "super deluxe" limited edition box set would be released on the same date as the regular edition, and a 36-second video preview of the box set was released on September 17. In mid September, publication was postponed further to a European release on October 29, an International release on November 1, and a North American release on November 2, 2010. Four teaser clips from the video were released on October 12, and nine days later, Metallica's performance of "Sad but True", taken from the film, was released. A three-and-a-half-minute trailer was released on September 21, 2010.

The Slayer title card before the band's performance is the only one of the four bands that did not feature their official logo. In addition, all Slayer members (except drummer Dave Lombardo) did not participate in the "Am I Evil?" performance due to lack of interest.

Event dates

Reception

The album was received positively by music critics. Thom Jurek gave it four out of five stars in his review for AllMusic, and stated that "each [song] is incredibly energetic, clearly riding the crowd excitement of the event, and the performances are stellar without a lapse." He pointed to Anthrax's "Madhouse" and "Antisocial"; Megadeth's "Head Crusher" and the "Peace Sells/Holy Wars Reprise"; Slayer's "Angel of Death", "Seasons in the Abyss", and "Raining Blood"; and Metallica's "Fade to Black", "Creeping Death", "Master of Puppets", and "For Whom the Bell Tolls" as musical highlights, and described the encore performance of "Am I Evil?", in which members of all four bands perform, as "an historic high point."

In a mixed review for Blogcritics, Chris Beaumont summed up that "Watching these promo DVDs makes me want the Blu-ray that much more. The performances are great, the sets are great, and it is hard not to get excited about these guys taking the stage together. This is metal."

Chad Bowar, writing for About.com, said that the concert was "one of the defining moments and biggest events in recent metal history" and commented that the bands "can still put on a great show" despite their age. He distinguished the styles of each band, writing: "Anthrax has a more lighthearted, fun approach, while Megadeth is 100 percent business with very little banter and focus on the music. Slayer has a more ominous vibe, although their evil mystique has lessened over the years. Metallica were very inclusive, with James Hetfield acting as everybody's favorite uncle interacting with the crowd and taking time to soak it all in."

Charts and certificates

Album charts

Video charts

Certifications

Contents
 The DVD's contents can be verified by AllMusic and the DVD's notes.

Track listing

Personnel
A complete list can be found at AllMusic.

Anthrax
 Joey Belladonna – lead vocals
 Rob Caggiano – lead guitar, backing vocals
 Scott Ian – rhythm guitar, backing vocals
 Frank Bello – bass, backing vocals
 Charlie Benante – drums

Megadeth 
 Dave Mustaine – guitars, lead vocals
 Chris Broderick – guitars, backing vocals
 David Ellefson – bass, backing vocals
 Shawn Drover – drums

Slayer
 Tom Araya – bass, vocals 
 Kerry King – guitars
 Jeff Hanneman – guitars
 Dave Lombardo – drums

Metallica 
 James Hetfield – lead vocals, rhythm guitar, acoustic guitar on "Fade to Black"
 Kirk Hammett – lead guitar, backing vocals
 Robert Trujillo – bass, backing vocals
 Lars Ulrich – drums

Production and assistance

 Warren Lee – bass technician, guitar technician
 Michael Pearce; Philip Richardson – editing
 John Wedge Branon – engineer, production manager, tour manager
 David May – executive producer

 Mark Workman – lighting director
 Doug C. Short and Scott Boculac – Megadeth audio
 Russ Russell; Andy Sneap – mixing
 Ross Halfin – photography
 Jim Parsons – producer

 Chris Blair; Michael McGuire – pyrotechnics
 Mike Osman – sound technician
Alan Doyle – stage manager
 Chris David – video technician

References

Live video albums
2010 video albums
2010 live albums
2010 in Bulgaria
Metallica video albums
Metallica live albums
Megadeth video albums
Anthrax (American band) live albums
Slayer video albums
Slayer live albums
Warner Records live albums
Warner Records video albums
Collaborative albums
Split albums
Vertigo Records live albums
Vertigo Records video albums
Mercury Records live albums
Mercury Records video albums
Live thrash metal albums
Megadeth live albums